Pseudobowmanella is a Gram-negative, facultatively anaerobic, rod-shaped and motile bacteria genus from the family of Alteromonadaceae with one known species (Planctobacterium marinum). Pseudobowmanella zhangzhouensis has been isolated from  wather from the Jiulong River in China.

References

Alteromonadales
Monotypic bacteria genera
Bacteria genera